The 2007 African Modern Pentathlon Championship took place in Cairo, Egypt from 22 February to 25 February. It served as an Olympic qualification event. The gold medallists earned qualification to the Olympic Games.

Women's results

References
African Championships Olympic QUalification. UIPM World. Retrieved 2019-11-23.

Modern pentathlon competitions
International sports competitions hosted by Egypt
African Modern
African Modern Pentathlon Championship, 2007
African Modern Pentathlon Championships
Modern pentathlon in Africa
Sports competitions in Cairo